Epsilon Sculptoris (ε Scl, ε Sculptoris) is a binary star in the constellation Sculptor.  It is approximately 91.7 light years from Earth.

The primary component, Epsilon Sculptoris A, is a yellow-white F-type main-sequence star with an apparent magnitude of +5.29. Orbiting it with a separation of 4.6 arcseconds, or at least 125 Astronomical Units, is Epsilon Sculptoris B, a yellow G-type main sequence dwarf with an apparent magnitude of +8.6.  A and B make one orbit around their centre of mass once every 1200 years.

There are two optical companions, the 15th magnitude designated Epsilon Sculptoris C at an angular separation of 15 arcseconds and the 11th magnitude Epsilon Sculptoris D, at a separation of 142 arcseconds.

This star will be in constellation Fornax around 2920 CE.

References

F-type main-sequence stars
G-type main-sequence stars
Binary stars
Sculptoris, Epsilon
Sculptor (constellation)
CD-25 704
010830
008209
0514